Gift Horse (released in the United States as Glory at Sea) is a 1952 British black-and-white World War II drama film. It was produced by George Pitcher, directed by Compton Bennett, and stars Trevor Howard, Richard Attenborough, James Donald, and Sonny Tufts.

The film follows the story of the fictional ship HMS Ballantrae and her crew from the time they come together in 1940 until they go on a one-way mission to destroy a German-held dry dock in France. The title is a reference to the old proverb "Never look a gift horse in the mouth".

Plot
In the Second World War, the Royal Navy is desperately short of personnel. Court-martialed eight years before, Lieutenant Commander Fraser is brought out of retirement and put in command of the antiquated "four pipe" First World War-vintage ship HMS Ballantrae, formerly USS Whittier, one of the Town-class destroyers from the destroyers-for-bases deal. On her first mission, convoy escort duty, Ballantrae suffers a burst steam pipe and has to be left behind while repairs are effected.

Fraser's officers and crew resent his efforts to whip them into shape, but he eventually molds them into an efficient fighting force, prior to being sent on Operation Boadicea, a daring suicide mission against a Nazi submarine base on the coast of France. (The latter part of the film is clearly based on HMS Campbeltown and the St Nazaire Raid.)

Cast

 Trevor Howard as Lieutenant Commander Hugh Algernon Fraser 
 Richard Attenborough as "Dripper" Daniels 
 James Donald as Lieutenant Richard Jennings
 Sonny Tufts as "Yank" Flanagan 
 Bernard Lee as Able Seaman "Stripey" Wood 
 Dora Bryan as Gladys Flanagan 
 Hugh Williams as Captain David G. Wilson, Division Commander
 Robin Bailey as Lieutenant Michael Grant, ship's pilot
 Meredith Edwards as Jones, Chief Engineer
 John Forrest as Appleby
 Patric Doonan as Petty Officer Martin 
 Sid James as Ned Hardy, owner of Golden Bull public house
 Tony Quinn as McConalog
 James Kenney as John A. Fraser, Hugh's son
 George Street as Court Member
 Hugh Hastings as Crewman
 James Carney as Bone
 Harold Siddons as Adm. Bartlett
 Harold Ayer as Lt. Cmdr. Carson
 Charles Lloyd-Pack as Member of Board of Inquiry (as Charles Lloyd Pack)
 Peter Bathurst as Member of Board of Inquiry
 William Russell as Crewman (as Russell Enoch)
 Anthony Oliver as Ship's Officer, Guns
 Joan Rice as June Mallory, WRNS cypher officer
 Glyn Houston as Morgan, Engine Room Artificer [uncredited]

Production
The real-life ship used in the film was HMS Leamington. Built in 1919 as the USS Twiggs, a Wickes-class destroyer, she was one of the last post-war survivors of the 50 elderly four-funnelled destroyers provided in 1940 by the USA as part of the "Destroyers for Bases Agreement": (also known as "The Fifty Ships that Saved the World"). She served on convoy duties, including as an escort for the ill-fated Convoy PQ 17. In 1943 she was transferred to the Royal Canadian Navy as HMCS Leamington. After a short period in reserve in 1944, she was one of seven sisters transferred to the Soviet Navy, and there became the Zguchij ("Firebrand"). Returned to the Royal Navy in 1950, the ship was listed for disposal in 1951, but before being broken up she was hired for the Gift Horse film. For the final scenes of the film, based on her sister-ship Campbeltown's daring St Nazaire Raid, her four funnels were reduced to two, and cut down at an angle to resemble the funnels of a German torpedo boat, just as Campbeltown's had been. She was finally broken up in December 1951.

It was shot at Isleworth Studios in London with sets designed by the art director Edward Carrick

Reception
The film performed poorly at the US box office, like most British war movies of this era.

References

External links
 
 
Review of film at Variety

1952 films
1950s war drama films
British war drama films
British black-and-white films
Films directed by Compton Bennett
World War II films based on actual events
Royal Navy in World War II films
Seafaring films based on actual events
Western Front of World War II films
Films scored by Clifton Parker
Films shot at Isleworth Studios
Films set in 1940
1950s English-language films
1950s British films